= Climate change in the Northern Mariana Islands =

Climate change in the Northern Mariana Islands encompasses the effects of climate change, attributed to man-made increases in atmospheric carbon dioxide, in the U.S. territory of the Northern Mariana Islands (CNMI), consisting of 14 islands in the northwestern Pacific Ocean.

A 2021 report by the Pacific Islands Regional Climate Assessment noted that the CNMI faced "hotter weather, stronger typhoons, coral reef death, and physical and mental health risks", with risks of damage to "high-value coastal infrastructure and the millions of dollars that ocean ecosystems add to the CNMI economy annually". A concern that has been raised in the international community with respect to Polynesian islands generally, including the CNMI, is delimiting the exclusive economic zones around islands "before they physically disappear".
